In music, Op. 85 stands for Opus number 85. Compositions that are assigned this number include:

 Beethoven – Christ on the Mount of Olives
 Britten – Owen Wingrave
 Elgar – Cello Concerto
 Hummel – Piano Concerto No. 2
 Mendelssohn – Songs without Words, Book VII
 Prokofiev – Zdravitsa
 Schumann – 12 Piano Pieces for Young and Older Children
 Strauss – Capriccio